Half Acre Beer Company is a brewery in Chicago, Illinois, United States.  The company was founded by Gabriel Magliaro in 2006, with its office located in Chicago. The recipes for the beers were developed in Chicago and the beer was initially brewed at Sand Creek Brewery in Black River Falls, Wisconsin.  Half Acre's first beer, Half Acre Lager, debuted in August 2007.

History
In March 2009, Half Acre Beer began production in its own brewery on Lincoln Avenue in the North Center neighborhood of Chicago. Building upon its growing popularity, a tap room adjacent to the brewhouse opened in 2012.  A 2013, Chicago magazine annual poll named the Half Acre tap room the city's eighth best bar. Because of its continued success, a kitchen was added in January 2016, completing the transition to a full service brew pub. In 2015, the brewery expanded by opening a second, larger brewhouse and pub on Balmoral Avenue in the Bowmanville neighborhood of Chicago, approximately a mile and a half from the Lincoln Avenue facility. In 2021, they consolidated operations into the Balmoral Avenue location, closing the Lincoln Avenue facility.

Since 2007, the company has sponsored the local bicycle club Half Acre Cycling.

To minimize waste from brewing, the company challenged engineering students from Northwestern University to find the best ways to reduce or reuse byproducts.

Beer
Half Acre brews six year-round beers, three seasonal beers, as well as monthly special releases and small batches for its taproom and beer garden.

When asked about the citrus flavor of Half Acre Lager, Magliaro has said that the only thing in his beer is water, yeast and "lots and lots" of German malt and Saaz hops.

In October 2014, Half Acre Heyoka won a silver medal at the Great American Beer Festival in the category of American-style IPA. In January 2015, Heyoka was renamed Senita after members of the American Indian Movement objected to the term "heyoka" being used for commercial purposes. In June 2015. the beer was renamed again, to Gone Away, after another brewery claimed that the name Senita infringed too closely on the name of one of its beers.

See also
 List of breweries in Illinois

References

External links 
 

American beer brands
Beer brewing companies based in Chicago
Manufacturing companies based in Chicago
American companies established in 2006